Pronunciator is a set of webpages, audio and video files, and mobile apps for learning any of 87 languages. Explanations are available in 50 languages. 1,500 libraries in the US and Canada subscribe and make it available free to their members, including state-wide in Texas, North Carolina, Louisiana, and Arkansas.

Methods of teaching
In each lesson (drop-down menus) students have to learn words in order, and can click to repeat when needed. The software can listen and score pronunciation, and students can record their voice, and compare it to the lesson. Some languages have grammar lessons as well as vocabulary. The "Main course" has "Core Vocabulary" with 100 categories from beginner to intermediate, Powerful Phrases with 50 travel categories, and 100 verbs conjugated. Some languages have audio downloads of songs, with lyrics, called ProRadio. Some languages have videos with subtitles which let learners loop any phrase in the video. There are lessons to prepare for the US citizenship exam and health vocabulary.

The recorded voices are native speakers of each language.

Languages taught
Afrikaans, Albanian, Amharic, Arabic, Armenian, Azerbaijani, Basque, Belarusian, Bengali, Bulgarian, Catalan, Cebuano, Chinese (Cantonese), Chinese (Mandarin), Chinese (Pinyin), Chinese (Xiang), Croatian, Czech, Danish, Dutch, English (American), English (British), Estonian, Finnish, French, Galician, German, Greek, Gujarati, Haitian Creole, Hebrew, Hiligaynon, Hindi, Hungarian, Icelandic, Indonesian, Irish, Italian, Japanese, Japanese (Romaji), Javanese, Korean, Kurdish, Lao, Latvian, Lithuanian, Macedonian, Malagasy, Malay, Malayalam, Maltese, Marathi, Mongolian, Nepali, Norwegian, Pashto, Persian, Polish, Portuguese (Brazil), Portuguese (Portugal), Romanian, Russian, Serbian, Sindhi, Sinhala, Slovak, Slovene, Somali, Spanish (Latin America), Spanish (Spain), Swahili, Swedish, Tagalog, Tamil, Telugu, Thai, Tibetan, Turkish, Ukrainian, Urdu, Uzbek, Vietnamese, Welsh, Xhosa

Public reception
Pronunciator has been reviewed by Library Journal

and was "Highly recommended" with three stars in Choice: Current Reviews for Academic Libraries.
 
It is used to teach undergraduates at major universities,

 
and used for the public at major city libraries.
 
It is cited in reporting on libraries.

See also
 Language education
 Language pedagogy
 List of Language Self-Study Programs

External links

Review of Pronunciator

References

Second-language acquisition
Language education materials
Multilingual websites
Language learning software